Khuzhir (Khujar) is a rural locality (a selo) in Okinsky District, Republic of Buryatia, Russia. The population was 625 as of 2010. There are 9 streets.

Geography 
Khuzhir is located 55 km north of Orlik (the district's administrative centre) by road. Shuluta-Tala is the nearest rural locality.

References 

Rural localities in Okinsky District